

Indianapolis 500-Mile Race all-time lap leaders

Two hundred thirty-eight drivers have led the Indianapolis 500-Mile Race, in 106 races.
Career lap leader percentage rounded to hundredths of a percent.
Green indicates drivers active as of most recent race.

 *  Lora L. Corum and  Floyd Davis are credited as being co-winners of the Indianapolis 500 in 1924 and 1941, respectively. However, as the winning entries in either race led only after their secondary drivers drove (and to the conclusion), Corum and Davis are not credited with leading any of those laps, nor did they lead throughout the remainder of their careers.

Lap Leaders, Individual Races

Most Laps Led
Fifty-seven of one hundred six Indianapolis 500-Mile Races have been won by the driver leading the most laps, 53.77%.

50%+ Race Laps Led, non-winning entries
Twenty separate entries in equal years, driven by sixteen drivers, have failed to win despite leading over half a given race's completed laps.

Notes
 1  Italian-born
 2  British-born
 3  French-born
 4  Swiss-born

Lap Leader records

Led opening lap and final lap: 21 entries among 19 drivers
Jimmy Murphy, 1922
Joe Boyer, 1924 (only occasion of occurrence in separate entries)
Peter DePaolo, 1925
Lee Wallard, 1951
Bill Vukovich, 1953
Jimmy Bryan, 1958
Jim Clark, 1965
Mario Andretti, 1969
Al Unser, 1970
Johnny Rutherford, 1976
Johnny Rutherford, 1980
Bobby Unser, 1981
Rick Mears, 1984
Emerson Fittipaldi, 1989
Rick Mears, 1991
Al Unser Jr., 1994
Buddy Rice, 2004
Scott Dixon, 2008
Hélio Castroneves, 2009
Dario Franchitti, 2010
Simon Pagenaud, 2019

Leaders Circle Club
In 1964, Autolite created the "Pacemakers Club," which recognized drivers who had led at least one lap during the Indianapolis 500. It quickly rose in stature and popularity, and became a highly sought-after honor associated with the Indianapolis 500. After changes in sponsorship, the organization was renamed the "Leaders Circle Club".

The qualifications were simple: any driver who had led at least one lap during the history of the race, whether living or already deceased, were recognized as members. At its inception, 102 drivers were listed as members. A total of 56 were deceased at the time, and 46 were living.

Honorees receive a jacket, and are honored at a banquet in their honor. The number of new members inducted at the banquet varies annually, as it is solely based on the previous year's first-time lap leaders. Some years can have as few as one or zero new members inducted, while other years have had as many as 4-5. The "club" is still active as of 2012.

References

IMS Official Statistics: List of Lap Leaders
Compilations of Indianapolis Star and Indianapolis News breakdowns of individual  races
Indianapolis 500 Chronicle, Rick Popely, June 1998

Lap Leaders